Richard Griffiths (born 28 September 1907 – unknown) was an Irish professional footballer who played as a winger in the Football League for Walsall and once for the Irish Free State national team.

Club career
Griffiths made his debut for Walsall in a 3–2 defeat to York City in the Third Division North on 17 November 1934. In his second match two weeks later he scored as Walsall beat Accrington Stanley 6–0 at Fellows Park. He made only eight appearances in total for the club and scored one goal.

International career
Griffiths made his debut for the Irish Free State in a 4–2 defeat to Hungary on 16 December 1934. This turned out to be his only appearance for his country.

References

1907 births
Republic of Ireland association footballers
Association football wingers
Republic of Ireland international footballers
English Football League players
Walsall F.C. players
Year of death missing